Marbleton may refer to:
 Marbleton, Dudswell, Quebec, Canada - a former village
 Marbleton, Wyoming, United States

It may also be a misspelling of Marbletown:

 Marbletown, New York, United States